The Calico Mountains of California are a mountain range located in the Mojave Desert. The range spans San Bernardino and Inyo counties in California.

Geography
The Calico Mountains are geologically colorful range that lie in a northwest-southeast direction, and are located just north of Barstow and Yermo, and of Interstate 15.

Historic Pickhandle Pass and Jackhammer Gap lie at the northern end of the mountains on Fort Irwin Road, with the Fort Irwin Military Reservation nearby. The Calico Mountains have been active in California mining history.

Peaks

Features
The Rainbow Basin geologic feature, in the Bureau of Land Management managed Rainbow Basin Natural Area, is just north of  Barstow.

Calico Ghost Town is located in the Yermo Hills (Calico Hills) at the western edge of the Calico Mountains, north of Yermo.

The Calico Early Man Site is a Paleo-Indians lithic workshop for Stone tools and a simple quarry archaeological site in the mountains also.

See also
Calico Mountains namesakes
 Calico and Odessa Railroad
 Calico Early Man Site
 Calico Ghost Town
 Calico Peaks
 Calico Print—publication
Local history
 Borate and Daggett Railroad ( site )
 Waterloo Mining Railroad ( site )
 Francis Marion Smith ( mining )
Related
 Mountain ranges of the Mojave Desert
 Protected areas of the Mojave Desert

References

External links
 Official Rainbow Basin Natural Area website
 Official Calico Ghost Town website

Mountain ranges of the Mojave Desert
Mountain ranges of San Bernardino County, California
Mountain ranges of Inyo County, California
Mining in California
Tourist attractions in San Bernardino County, California